Grayslake is a commuter railroad station on Metra's Milwaukee District North Line in Grayslake, Illinois. The station is located on the corner of Lake Street and Saint Paul Street,  from Chicago Union Station, the southern terminus of the line, and serves commuters between Union Station and Fox Lake, Illinois. In Metra's zone-based fare system, Grayslake is in zone I. As of 2018, Grayslake is the 103rd busiest of Metra's 236 non-downtown stations, with an average of 470 weekday boardings.

As of December 12, 2022, Grayslake is served by 37 trains (17 inbound, 20 outbound) on weekdays, by 18 trains (nine in each direction) on Saturdays, and by all 18 trains (nine in each direction) on Sundays and holidays. On weekdays, four inbound trains originate from here, and four outbound trains terminate here.

Some trains on the MD-N terminate at Grayslake, mainly in the early afternoon. No trains terminate here on weekends.

Parking is available on both sides of the tracks, along the east side of Lake Street, the south side of St. Paul Street, and north of the intersection of St. Paul and Slusser Streets.

Grayslake is the only station on the Fox Lake Subdivision with two tracks and two platforms. Because of this, Grayslake is used as a passing siding to allow trains traveling in opposite directions to pass each other. Another station in Grayslake is on  along Metra's North Central Service line.

Bus connections
Pace
 570 Fox Lake-CLC

References

External links

Metra stations in Illinois
Former Chicago, Milwaukee, St. Paul and Pacific Railroad stations
Railway stations in Lake County, Illinois
1895 establishments in Illinois
Railway stations in the United States opened in 1895